Leobardo Jaime Araguz (born January 18, 1970) is a former professional American football punter. He played since 1996 with the Oakland Raiders, the Detroit Lions, the Minnesota Vikings, and the Seattle Seahawks. In 2001, he played for the New York/New Jersey Hitmen in the XFL, and then the Grande Valley Sol of X-League Indoor Football from 2011 to 2015. 

Araguz holds the NFL record for the most punts in a single game with 16, set in a 7-6 win over the San Diego Chargers on October 11, 1998.

High school years
Araguz attended Harlingen High School in Harlingen, Texas and was a student and a letterman in football and soccer.

College years
Araguz attended Stephen F. Austin State University and was a student and a letterman in football. In football, he was a four-year letterman and a three-time All-Southland Conference selection. As a junior, he led the Southland Conference in average yards per punt with an average of 42.6 yards per punt.

Personal life
Araguz has three children: Aaron James Araguz, Noelle Araguz, and Nia Araguz.

References

External links
 Leo Araguz' statistics in the XFL

1970 births
Living people
People from Pharr, Texas
People from Harlingen, Texas
American football punters
Stephen F. Austin Lumberjacks football players
Oakland Raiders players
Detroit Lions players
Minnesota Vikings players
Seattle Seahawks players
American sportspeople of Mexican descent
Rhein Fire players
Baltimore Ravens players
Rio Grande Valley Sol players
New York/New Jersey Hitmen players